Kirby's Dream Buffet is a party video game developed by HAL Laboratory and published by Nintendo for the Nintendo Switch. It is a spin-off game in the Kirby series. The game was released digitally on August 17, 2022.

Gameplay 
Kirby's Dream Buffet is a multiplayer game where four ball-shaped Kirbys roll through food-themed courses and compete to collect the most strawberries. Players can defeat enemies and use special abilities on the stage to attack each other and collect bonuses. The game can be played both locally and online with both random matching and private lobbies.

There are 3 types of rounds, each with several different stages:
 Race: The stage is laid out like a race track. The first players to reach the goal are granted extra strawberries.
 Minigame: Mixed events where players gain strawberries by following the instructions given. The stage is typically small with defining features related to the goal given to the players.
 Battle Royale: Similar to Minigame rounds, the stage is small and features many objects and hills close together. Abilities and strawberries drop onto the stage over time, and players can steal others' strawberries by knocking them off the stage.
In the Grand Prix mode, players play a Race, a Minigame, another Race, and then a Battle Royale. Afterwards, bonuses are given out depending on random statistical conditions. The player with the highest strawberry count wins the game.

After completing individual rounds or a Grand Prix, players are awarded points to raise their 'Gourmet Rank.' Playing online gives a boost to the points gained. Each time the player's rank increases, they unlock a new costume, color, stage, or music track that can be used for customization. They can also unlock 'Character Treats', a cookie based on a character from the Kirby series which can be displayed on a cake in Kirby's 'Home Table'.

Development 
The game was revealed by Nintendo with an announcement trailer via social media on July 12, 2022. The release date was revealed during the Kirby 30th Anniversary Music Festival, which took place on August 11, 2022.

Reception 

Kirby's Dream Buffet received "mixed or average" reviews according to review aggregator Metacritic.

The download card for Kirby's Dream Buffet sold 7,218 units within its first week of release in Japan, making it the sixth bestselling retail game of the week in the country.

Nintendo Life liked the visuals and remarked that they were "pretty impressed with how smooth things run". Destructoid enjoyed how players grew physically bigger the more successful they were, "thus becoming a more obvious target". Nintendo World Report criticized the minigames, describing them as "overly simple, empty-calorie competitions". TouchArcade felt the game was lacking content, saying, "you’ll likely have seen all that’s worth seeing in a single session".

References

External links 
Kirby's Dream Buffet on the Nintendo eShop

2022 video games
Kirby (series) video games
Cooperative video games
Nintendo Switch games
Nintendo Switch-only games
Multiplayer and single-player video games
Video games developed in Japan
Video games about food and drink
HAL Laboratory games